Penthouse is an Australian television series which aired 1960 to 1961 on Sydney station ATN-7. It was a daytime series featuring Pat Firman interviewing guests in a set designed to look like a penthouse apartment. It was sponsored by the magazines Woman's Day and Pix.

Episodes
The archival status of the series is not known, though a single episode is held by the National Film and Sound Archive. This episode features singer Rolf Harris and Janine Arnold.

References

External links
Penthouse on IMDb

1960 Australian television series debuts
1961 Australian television series endings
Black-and-white Australian television shows
English-language television shows
Australian television talk shows